Leo Beuerman is a 1969 American short documentary film directed by Gene Boomer. It was nominated for an Academy Award for Best Documentary Short.

Summary
It tells the story of Leo Beuerman (19021974), a diminutive, disabled man who sold pencils and became a fixture on the downtown sidewalks of Lawrence, Kansas in the 1950s and 1960s thanks to his determination.

Production
The film was produced by Russell A. Mosser and Arthur H. Wolf of Centron Corporation.  The simple profile of a short handicapped man with his tractor in downtown Lawrence was produced on a budget of $12,000 and eventually became one of the most popular classroom films of all time, selling an impressive 2300 prints.

References

External links
Leo Beuerman: A Legacy at Phoenix Media (corporate heir of Centron)
Leo Beuerman Official Website (as archived July 19, 2012)

1969 films
1969 short films
1960s short documentary films
American short documentary films
Documentary films about people with disability
1960s English-language films
1960s American films